Kraubath an der Mur is a municipality in the district of Leoben in the Austrian state of Styria.

Name
The name of this place is mentioned many times in the 11th-13th century charters and it is written regularly as "Chrowat" which is toponym  variant of name "Croat".

Geography
Kraubath an der Mur lies in the central Mur valley between Leoben and Knittelfeld.

References

Cities and towns in Leoben District